Kim Hoàng painting (Vietnamese: Tranh Kim Hoàng) is a genre of Vietnamese woodcut paintings originated from Kim Hoàng village of Hoài Đức, Hanoi, Vietnam. In the past, Kim Hoang painting was a popular element of the Tết holiday, together with Dong Ho and Hang Trong painting, but this tradition was lost in the middle of the 20th century and today several authentic pictures of Kim Hoang painting are found only in museums or fine art galleries. However, the art of making Kim Hoang painting is still considered a symbol of traditional culture and aesthetic value of Vietnam.

Themes and making

Produced in the countryside as Dong Ho painting, pictures of Kim Hoang share many common themes with ones of Dong Ho such as everyday activities, animals and sprititual signs. The distinct feature of Kim Hoang painting is several lines of poem written in form of chữ thảo at the left corner of the painting, the content of those lines along with the illustration help emphasize the meaning of the picture. The popular examples of Kim Hoang painting are Gà độc (Cockerel) and Lợn độc (Pig).

The woodcuts of Kim Hoang village are more delicate and detailed than ones of Dong Ho village, they are used to print in sheets of paper which are dyed beforehand with red or yellow colours, the red ones are called giấy hồng điều (scarlet paper) and the yellow ones is giấy vàng tầu (Chinese yellow paper). The colours used in making Kim Hoang painting are obtained from black Chinese ink and other natural materials such as white gypsum, red vermilion and yellow gardenia. To strengthen the durability of the colours, the craftsmen often mixed colour paints with glue extracted from buffalo skin. Like the production of Hang Trong painting, Kim Hoang craftsmen only used the woodblocks to create the black outlines and then drew and coloured details by their own hands. For this reason, pictures of a subject, although outlined by the same woodcut, are slightly different from one to another, thus they become more valuable and attractive to customers.

History
The origin of Kim Hoang painting was dated back to the 18th century during the reign of the Lê dynasty. The pictures were made in the Kim Hoàng village, now in Hoai Duc (Hanoi), which was one of the few place where folk paintings were made in Vietnam during the dynastic time, along with Hang Trong, Dong Ho and Sinh village. Kim Hoang painting was well received in the 19th century but the tradition of making pictures gradually declined and ultimately lost in the middle of the 20th century. One of the main factor that led to the extinction of the manufacture was a flood in 1915 which destroyed almost all original woodblocks of the village. Nowadays, authentic Kim Hoang pictures are only found in museums and galleries.

Pig paintings Kim Hoàng typical and popular
Pig paintings are known as the unique artwork of the Kim Hoang painting series. Painting has religious meaning and good luck, so it is very popular when it comes to the new year.

Kim Hoang Picture of the pig brings a bohemian and natural line with a clever combination of colors and highlights on the red paper. Pig paintings own unique beauty, highly symbolic.

The artisan shows a liberal drawing that makes the image of a more stylized pig with details replaced by a pattern but still retains its inherent soul. The pig's ears disappear instead of spiraling motifs, the definitive strokes of the pen are extremely impressive.

Kim Hoang Painting is different from other people's paintings in that it is a combination of printing, coloring and skillfully drawing to create a flexible but definitive line. This is a line of folk paintings with Vietnamese cultural beauty that needs to be handed down and preserved. Hopefully, the information shared from the article will help you no longer be surprised when it comes to folk paintings Kim Hoang.

See also
Dong Ho painting
Hang Trong painting

References

Vietnamese art
Culture of Hanoi
Vietnamese painting